Mutsuko (written:  or ) is a feminine Japanese given name. Notable people with the name include:

, Japanese actress
, Japanese basketball player
, Japanese actress

Fictional characters
, a character in the manga series Major 2nd

Japanese feminine given names